Dahoam is Dahoam ("Home is Home") is a German television soap opera. It concerns the lives of the residents of the fictitious village of Lansing in Upper Bavaria. The characters speak the Bavarian dialect (with some adjustments to standard German). The show is similar to the British ITV show Where the Heart is.

Plot
Dahoam is Dahoam is about experiences of the inhabitants of the fictitious Upper Bavarian village Lansing. Tales are told from the family and everyday life, which among other things to the innkeeper family Brunner, the brewery family Kirchleitner and the family Preissinger rank. The action-bearing main characters form a tribe ensemble, which changes over the seasons again and again.

See also
List of German television series

External links

2007 German television series debuts
2000s German television series
2010s German television series
2020s German television series
Television shows set in Bavaria
German-language television shows
Das Erste original programming
Bayerischer Rundfunk